CJTT-FM 104.5 is an FM radio station in Temiskaming Shores, Ontario, with a hot adult contemporary format. The station is owned by Connelly Communications Corporation, which also owns CJKL-FM in Kirkland Lake. Connelly Communications is owned by Rob Connelly of Kirkland Lake.

The station offers a hot adult contemporary format with a mix of current music and classic hits. Hourly news and sports is provided through local announcers/reporters and Broadcast News / Canadian Press. A live online feed is available on the station's website.

History

CJTT was originally launched in 1967 at 1230 kHz on the AM band as a semi-satellite station of CJKL. The station was originally owned by Kirkland Lake Broadcasting Ltd. Connelly Communications Corporation purchased CJTT and CJKL in Kirkland Lake in 1985. CJTT was a CBC affiliate from 1987–1996. In 1998, CJTT moved from 1230 AM to its current FM frequency at 104.5 FM.

In 2002, CJTT won the Community Builder Award for its longstanding community involvement.  It was presented in Haileybury, during An Evening of Excellence.

In 2011, CJTT won the Corporate Citizen Award in recognition of ongoing and significant support of community groups and activities contributing to the quality of life throughout Temiskaming.  The award was presented at the Annual Chamber Dinner by the Temiskaming Shores and Area Chamber of Commerce.

Special Programming
Bob Kingsley's Country Top 40 with Fritz Countdown: Saturdays 8am-Noon (Country Music Countdown)

American Top 40 with Ryan Seacrest: Saturdays Noon-4 pm (Pop Music Countdown)

Saturday Night Rocks: Saturdays 4pm-Midnight (Classic Rock)

Sunday Morning Olides: Sundays 8am-Noon (50's, 60's & 70's music)

CJTT Citizen of the Year Award
Since 1993, CJTT has presented this annual award to honour local citizens, groups and organizations who have contributed to improving the quality of life for the people of Temiskaming Shores. In addition, the station also presents the CJTT Lifetime Achievement award recognizing a lifetime of contribution to the community.

CJTT Christmas Wish
Since 1987, CJTT has hosted the Christmas Wish program for less fortunate children in the area. Funds for the program are raised through an on-air fundraising campaign held each November. The program provides new clothing and toys for over 300 children each year.

Lifestyles Home Show
CJTT hosts Temiskaming Shores' annual home show each April on the floor of the Horne Granite Centre. The event draws over 5,000 people each year for a 2-day sale featuring area merchants. This event was put on hold in 2020-2021 as a safety precaution for COVID-19.

Spooktacular
CJTT FM's Spooktacular is a program that encourages elementary school-aged children to return home early from trick or treating on Halloween. Children fill out pledge cards and return them to the radio station. On Halloween night children win goodies bags if they are home on time when the station calls.

References

External links
CJTT
 

JTT
JTT
Temiskaming Shores
Radio stations established in 1967
1967 establishments in Ontario